The Dukedom of Inverness was a title in the Jacobite Peerage of Great Britain, and as such was not recognised by the government or monarch or Great Britain.  Its only holder was John Hay of Cromlix.

Lady Cecilia Underwood was the second wife of Prince Augustus Frederick, Duke of Sussex, the sixth son of King George III; however, their marriage was deemed illegal because of the Royal Marriages Act 1772, so Cecilia was never recognized as Duchess of Sussex or a British princess. Instead, Queen Victoria later created Cecilia Duchess of Inverness with remainder to the heirs male of her body lawfully begotten.

See also
 Earl of Inverness

References

Inverness
Extinct dukedoms in the Jacobite Peerage
Noble titles created in 1840